Çarxana or Charkhana or Charkhany may refer to:
Çarxana, Qabala, Azerbaijan
Çarxana, Siazan, Azerbaijan